Leonid Bogdanov (born 23 June 1927) is a Soviet Olympic fencer. He won a bronze medal in the team sabre event at the 1956 Summer Olympics.

References

1927 births
Living people
Soviet male fencers
Olympic fencers of the Soviet Union
Fencers at the 1956 Summer Olympics
Olympic bronze medalists for the Soviet Union
Olympic medalists in fencing
Medalists at the 1956 Summer Olympics